In mathematics, a Markov odometer is a certain type of topological dynamical system. It plays a fundamental role in ergodic theory and especially in orbit theory of dynamical systems, since a theorem of H. Dye asserts that every ergodic nonsingular transformation is orbit-equivalent to a Markov odometer.

This group can be endowed with the structure of a dynamical system; the result is a conservative dynamical system.

The general form, which is called "Markov odometer", can be constructed through Bratteli–Vershik diagram to define Bratteli–Vershik compactum space together with a corresponding transformation.

Nonsingular odometers

Several kinds of non-singular odometers may be defined. 
These are sometimes referred to as adding machines.
The simplest is illustrated with the Bernoulli process. This is the set of all infinite strings in two symbols, here denoted by  endowed with the product topology. This definition extends naturally to a more general odometer defined on the product space

for some sequence of integers  with each 

The topological entropy of every adding machine is zero. Any continuous map of an interval with a topological entropy of zero is topologically conjugate to an adding machine, when restricted to its action on the topologically invariant transitive set, with periodic orbits removed.

Dyadic odometer

The set of all infinite strings in strings in two symbols  has a natural topology, the product topology, generated by the cylinder sets. The product topology extends to a Borel sigma-algebra; let  denote that algebra. Individual points  are denoted as 

Note that the Bernoulli measure is not the same as the 2-adic measure on the dyadic integers! Formally, one can observe that  is also the base space for the dyadic integers; however, the dyadic integers are endowed with a metric, the p-adic metric, which induces a metric topology distinct from the product topology used here.

The space  can be endowed with addition, defined as coordinate addition, with a carry bit. That is, for each coordinate, let

where  and

 

inductively. Increment-by-one is then called the (dyadic) odometer. It is called the odometer due to how it looks when it "rolls over":  is the transformation . Note that  and that  is -measurable, that is,  for all 

The transformation  is non-singular for every . Recall that a measurable transformation  is non-singular when, given , one has that  if and only if . In this case, one finds

where .

The transformation  is ergodic. This follows because, for every  and natural number , the orbit of  under  is the set . This in turn implies that  is conservative, since every invertible ergodic nonsingular transformation in a nonatomic space is conservative.

Integer odometers
The same construction enables to define such a system for every product of discrete spaces.  In general, one writes

The corresponding map is defined by 

This is again a topological group.

A special case of this is the Ornstein odometer, which is defined on the space 

with the measure a product of

Sandpile model
A concept closely related to the conservative odometer is that of the abelian sandpile model. This model replaces the directed linear sequence of finite groups constructed above by an undirected graph  of vertexes and edges. At each vertex  one places a finite group  with  the degree of the vertex . Transition functions are defined by the graph Laplacian. That is, one can increment any given vertex by one; when incrementing the largest group element (so that it increments back down to zero), each of the neighboring vertexes are incremented by one.

Sandpile models differ from the above definition of a conservative odometer in three different ways. First, in general, there is no unique vertex singled out as the starting vertex, whereas in the above, the first vertex is the starting vertex; it is the one that is incremented by the transition function. Next, the sandpile models in general use undirected edges, so that the wrapping of the odometer redistributes in all directions. A third difference is that sandpile models are usually not taken on an infinite graph, and that rather, there is one special vertex singled out, the "sink", which absorbs all increments and never wraps. The sink is equivalent to cutting away the infinite parts of an infinite graph, and replacing them by the sink; alternately, as ignoring all changes past that termination point.

Markov odometer

Let  be an ordered Bratteli–Vershik diagram, consists on a set of vertices of the form  (disjoint union) where  is a singleton and on a set of edges  (disjoint union).

The diagram includes source surjection-mappings  and range surjection-mappings . We assume that  are comparable if and only if .

For such diagram we look at the product space  equipped with the product topology. Define "Bratteli–Vershik compactum" to be the subspace of infinite paths,

 

Assume there exists only one infinite path  for which each  is maximal and similarly one infinite path .

Let  be a sequence of stochastic matrices  such that  if and only if . Then the system  is called a "Markov odometer".

See also
 Abelian sandpile model

References

Further reading
 
 

dynamical systems
ergodic theory